Shakeel Ahmad (born 2 January 1956) was a member of the 12th and 14th Lok Sabha of India. He was a general secretary of the Indian National Congress (INC).

Political career
Ahmad was first elected as MLA in 1985, and thereafter in 1990 and 2000. He was elected to Lok Sabha in 1998 and again in 2004.

See also
List of politicians from Bihar
 Bihar Pradesh Congress Committee

References

1956 births
Indian National Congress politicians from Bihar
Living people
India MPs 2004–2009
Union ministers of state of India
20th-century Indian Muslims
21st-century Indian Muslims
20th-century Indian medical doctors
India MPs 1998–1999
Lok Sabha members from Bihar
Medical doctors from Bihar
People from Madhubani district
Bihari politicians